Listen is a 2020 Portuguese drama film written and directed by Ana Rocha de Sousa that stars Lúcia Moniz and Sophia Myles. The film premiered in the Horizon section of the 77th Venice International Film Festival, in which it won the Special Jury Prize. It was selected as the Portuguese entry for the Best International Feature Film at the 93rd Academy Awards. However, in December 2020 the film was disqualified, as more than half of its dialogue was in English.

Plot
A Portuguese couple living in London have their three children taken away from them by social services, and they fight to get them back.

Cast
 Lúcia Moniz as Bela
 Sophia Myles as Ann Payne
 Ruben Garcia as Jota
 Kiran Sonia Sawar as Anjali
 James Felner as Diego
 Brian Bovell as Social services officer
 Maisie Sly as Lu
 Susanna Cappellaro as Teacher
 Jon Rumney as Shop owner

See also
 List of submissions to the 93rd Academy Awards for Best International Feature Film
 List of Portuguese submissions for the Academy Award for Best International Feature Film

References

External links
 

2020 films
2020 drama films
2020s Portuguese-language films
2020s English-language films
2020 multilingual films
Portuguese drama films
Films about families
Films set in London
Portuguese multilingual films
Sophia Award winners